Yodha is a 1991 Indian Hindi-language action drama film directed by Rahul Rawail. The film stars Sunny Deol, Sanjay Dutt, Sangeeta Bijlani and Danny Denzogpa in lead roles, along with Shilpa Shirodkar in special appearance.

The film released on 22nd February 1991, clashing with Patthar Ke Phool starring Salman Khan and Raveena Tandon. It received mostly average reviews and was a box office flop.

Plot
Karan Shrivastav, a lawyer crusades for truth, fairness and justice, is the son of Chandrakant Shrivastav, a journalist who uses his journalistic expertise to expose and unmask Justice Dharmesh Agnihotri, who is known as "Daaga" in the underworld. Suraj Singh is a man victimized by Fate. To bear the loss of his love, Shilpa, he gets addicted to drugs. Then in a complete reversal of attitude he turns against drug dealers and vows to bring an end to the deadly drug smuggling which wreaks such havoc in people's lives. Dharmesh's daughter Vidya Agnihotri  loves Karan. Karan idolizes Justice Dharmesh Agnihotri, unaware of the man behind the mask of respectability. Daaga hires Suraj and deliberately creates animosity between Suraj and Karan. The enmity between Suraj and Karan is sealed when Karan's father Chandrakant is framed for murder and sent to jail where he is killed. Karan loses complete faith in the judicial system and vows to revenge on Dharmesh.

Cast
 Sunny Deol as Advocate Karan Srivastav
 Sanjay Dutt as Suraj Singh
 Sangeeta Bijlani as Vidya Agnihotri
 Paresh Rawal as Chhaganlal
 Danny Denzongpa as Justice Dharmesh Agnihotri / Daaga
 Shilpa Shirodkar as Shilpa (Special Appearance)
 Shafi Inamdar as Chandrakant Shrivastav 
 Anjana Mumtaz as Mrs. Shrivastav 
 Abhinav Chaturvedi as Pawan Shrivastav 
 Sanam as Bharati Singh
 Jagdish Raj as Inspector Shinde
 Annu Kapoor as Umeed Singh
 Bob Christo as Christo
 Anjan Srivastav as Minister
 Rana Jung Bahadur as Jailor Rana Pratap

Soundtrack

The music of songs was composed by Bappi Lahiri and lyrics were written by Anand Bakshi.

References

External links

1990s Hindi-language films
1991 films
Films directed by Rahul Rawail
Films scored by Bappi Lahiri
Indian action drama films